The Cornell Policy Review is an online academic journal published by the Cornell Institute for Public Affairs. It is verified by the Network of Schools of Public Policy, Affairs, and Administration and edited and run by the program's students. It was originally published biannually, but switched to a rolling online publication in the 2015–16 academic year. Formerly known as The Current, the journal publishes articles, commentaries, and interviews relating to public policy.

References

External links 
 

Academic journals edited by students
Cornell University academic journals
Biannual journals
English-language journals
Political science journals
Publications with year of establishment missing
Academic journals published by universities and colleges of the United States
1996 establishments in New York (state)